Enterprise imaging has been defined as "a set of strategies, initiatives, and workflows implemented across a healthcare enterprise to consistently and optimally capture, index, manage, store, distribute, view, exchange, and analyze all clinical imaging and multimedia content to enhance the electronic health record". The concepts of enterprise imaging are elucidated in a series of papers by members of the HIMSS-SIIM Enterprise Imaging Workgroup.

The use of the term enterprise imaging in this manner is relatively new, having previously been used to describe expanding access to radiology images throughout an enterprise. The concept of expanding PACS to include visible light imaging and other modalities beyond radiology and cardiology dates back to the relatively early days of PACS.

See also
 DICOM
 Digital Photography
 Vendor Neutral Archive
Medical imaging
Medical image sharing
Data governance
Picture archiving and communication system
Medical specialty
Medical photography
Imaging informatics

References

Medical imaging
Digital photography
Standards for electronic health records
Health care